Farlowella isbruckeri is a species of armored catfish endemic to Brazil where it is found in the upper Paraguay River basin.  This species grows to a length of  SL.

References
 

isbruckeri
Fish of South America
Fish of Brazil
Endemic fauna of Brazil
Fish described in 1997
Taxa named by Michael Eugene Retzer
Taxa named by Lawrence M. Page